Switzerland participated in the Eurovision Song Contest 2004 with the song "Celebrate" written by Greg Manning. The song was performed by Piero Esteriore and the MusicStars. The Swiss broadcaster SRG SSR idée suisse returned to the Eurovision Song Contest after a one-year absence following their relegation from 2003 as one of the bottom five countries in the 2002 contest. The Swiss entry for the 2004 contest in Istanbul, Turkey was selected through the national final Eurosong 2004, organised by the broadcasters part of SRG SSR idée suisse. The Swiss-German/Romansh broadcaster Schweizer Fernsehen der deutschen und rätoromanischen Schweiz (SF DRS), the Swiss-French broadcaster Télévision Suisse Romande (TSR) and the Swiss-Italian broadcaster Televisione svizzera di lingua italiana (TSI) each conducted varying selections and a total of twelve entries were selected to advance to the televised national final—four artists and songs from each selection. The twelve finalists performed during the national final on 6 March 2004 where two rounds of regional televoting ultimately selected "Celebrate" performed by Piero Esteriore and the MusicStars as the winner.

Switzerland competed in the semi-final of the Eurovision Song Contest which took place on 12 May 2004. Performing during the show in position 3, "Celebrate" was not announced among the top 10 entries of the semi-final and therefore did not qualify to compete in the final. It was later revealed that Switzerland placed twenty-second (last) out of the 22 participating countries in the semi-final and failed to score any points. This marked the fourth time the nation had received nul points in the history of the competition.

Background 

Prior to the 2004 contest, Switzerland had participated in the Eurovision Song Contest forty-four times since its first entry in 1956. Switzerland is noted for having won the first edition of the Eurovision Song Contest with the song "Refrain" performed by Lys Assia. Their second and, to this point, most recent victory was achieved in 1988 when Canadian singer Céline Dion won the contest with the song "Ne partez pas sans moi". In 2002, Switzerland placed 22nd earning 15 points with the song "Dans le jardin de mon âme" performed by Francine Jordi.

The Swiss national broadcaster, SRG SSR idée suisse, broadcasts the event within Switzerland and organises the selection process for the nation's entry. SRG SSR idée suisse confirmed their intentions to participate at the 2004 Eurovision Song Contest on 10 July 2003. Along with their participation confirmation, the broadcaster also announced that the Swiss entry for the 2004 contest would be selected through a national final. Switzerland has selected their entry for the Eurovision Song Contest through both national finals and internal selections in the past. Since 1998, the broadcaster has opted to organize a national final in order to select the Swiss entry.

Before Eurovision

Eurosong 2004 
Eurosong 2004 was the Swiss national final that selected Switzerland's entry for the Eurovision Song Contest 2004. The national final was a collaboration between three broadcasters in Switzerland: the Swiss-German/Romansh broadcaster Schweizer Fernsehen der deutschen und rätoromanischen Schweiz (SF DRS), the Swiss-French broadcaster Télévision Suisse Romande (TSR) and the Swiss-Italian broadcaster Televisione svizzera di lingua italiana (TSI). The show took place on 6 March 2004 at the TSR Studio 4 in Geneva, hosted by Jean-Marc Richard and was televised on SF DRS with German commentary by Sandra Studer, TSI with Italian commentary by Roberta Foglia and TSR.

Selection process 
The selection process took place in two stages before the finalists for the live show and ultimately the winner are selected. The first stage of the competition included SF DRS, TSR and TSI each conducting varying selections in order to determine the candidates they submitted for the second stage of the competition. Each broadcaster submitted four candidates to proceed to the second stage, the televised national final, where the winning artist and song was selected to represent Switzerland in Istanbul.

 The SF DRS selection involved a collaboration with Universal Music and the casting show MusicStar. 27 songs were submitted by the record label and music producers of MusicStar and an expert jury selected the top eight songs. The top four contestants of the first season of MusicStar each selected one of the eight songs as the SF DRS candidates for the national final.
 53 artists were directly invited by TSR to submit their entries to the broadcaster. Following an internal selection from 26 entries ultimately received, four entries were selected as the TSR candidates for the national final.
 TSI directly invited 78 artists and composers to submit their entries. A jury panel evaluated the 35 entry submissions received and selected the four TSI candidates for the national final.

Final 
The final took place on 6 March 2004. The twelve candidate songs in contention to represent Switzerland were performed and two rounds of regional televoting selected the winner. In the first round, the top six entries were selected to advance to the second round. The second round results were aggregated to the first which selected "Celebrate" performed by Piero Esteriore and the MusicStars as the winner. A total of 631,000 votes were registered over both rounds. In addition to the performances from the competing artists, the band Core22 and British singer Jamelia performed as the interval acts.

At Eurovision

It was announced that the competition's format would be expanded to include a semi-final in 2004. According to the rules, all nations with the exceptions of the host country, the "Big Four" (France, Germany, Spain and the United Kingdom), and the ten highest placed finishers in the 2003 contest are required to qualify from the semi-final on 12 May 2004 in order to compete for the final on 15 May 2004; the top ten countries from the semi-final progress to the final. On 23 March 2004, a special allocation draw was held which determined the running order for the semi-final and Switzerland was set to perform in position 3, following the entry from Belarus and before the entry from Latvia. At the end of the semi-final, Switzerland was not announced among the top 10 entries in the semi-final and therefore failed to qualify to compete in the final. It was later revealed that Switzerland placed twenty-second (last) in the semi-final, failing to score any points. This marked the fourth time Switzerland received nul points, the previous occasions being in 1964, 1967 and 1998.

In Switzerland, three broadcasters that form SRG SSR idée suisse aired both shows of the contest. Marco Fritsche provided German commentary on SF DRS, Jean-Marc Richard and Marie-Thérèse Porche provided French commentary on TSR, while Daniela Tami and Claudio Lazzarino provided Italian commentary on TSI. The Swiss spokesperson, who announced the Swiss votes during the final, was Emel Aykanat.

Voting 
Below is a breakdown of points awarded to Switzerland and awarded by Switzerland in the semi-final and grand final of the contest. The nation awarded its 12 points to Serbia and Montenegro in the semi-final and the final of the contest.

Points awarded to Switzerland
Switzerland did not receive any points at the 2004 Eurovision Song Contest semi-final.

Points awarded by Switzerland

References

2004
Countries in the Eurovision Song Contest 2004
Eurovision